SCPT may refer to:
Surveillance de la correspondance par poste et télécommunication
Tom Clancy's Splinter Cell: Pandora Tomorrow